Saint Arbogast of Strassburg; ; ; ;  600s  700 AD)  was a 7th-century missionary in the Frankish Empire and an early Bishop of Strasbourg.

Biography

Only little historical facts of his life can be stated with certainty, other than that he came to Francia, was appointed Bishop of Strasbourg and was venerated from the early medieval period as the saint who brought Christianity to the Alsace. Because of this, the given name Arbogast became especially popular in the region. His origin is variously given as Scotland or Ireland, or Aquitania.

According to the vita, a 10th-century hagiographical account of his life, Arbogast found a warm friend in the Merovingian King Dagobert II of Austrasia, who reigned Austrasia 673-679. On Dagobert's accession, Arbogast was appointed Bishop of Strasbourg, and was famed for sanctity and miracles.

Still according to the vita, Arbogast brought back to life Dagobert's son, Siegebert, who had been killed by a fall from his horse. Siegebert had been boar hunting with his father’s huntsmen in forests along the Ill River near Ebersheim, and became separated from the others. He encountered a boar, and his startled horse reared, throwing him and trampling him while his foot was caught in his stirrup. His companions found him and took him home, where he died the next day. King Dagobert summoned Arbogast, and the holy man prayed to Saint Mary, mother of Jesus: as she had carried the life of the entire world, would she not intercede for the life of this one boy? Siegebert stood up in his burial shroud.  When the king offered bishop Arbogast money in reward, he declined, suggesting instead that land be donated to build a cathedral at Strasbourg.

According to the vita, he died in 678 and was buried outside of the city. He was buried either in the old Roman necropolis or on the side of Hangman's Hill, where a gallows was located and only malefactors were interred. The site of his burial was subsequently deemed suitable for a church, and a chapel to was built in honor of St Michael. Arbogast is commemorated on 21 July.

Arbogast appears on the coat of arms of Batzendorf.

References

Sources 
 
 Ward, Donald (translator), The German Legends of the Brothers Grimm, Vol. II, Institute for the Study of the Human Issues, Philadelphia (1981), legend 437.
Grattan-Flood, William. "St. Arbogast." The Catholic Encyclopedia. Vol. 1. New York: Robert Appleton Company, 1907. 14 Apr. 2013

External links 

Bishops of Strasbourg
7th-century births
7th-century deaths
7th-century Frankish bishops
7th-century Frankish saints
Year of birth unknown
Alsatian saints